Thunderstone is a fantasy deck-building card game series designed by Mike Elliott, with artwork by Jason Engle. It was first published by Alderac Entertainment Group in 2009. Each card has dimensions of 6.3 cm x 8.8 cm (2.5in x 3.5in). It has been translated into several languages.

Gameplay
Gameplay involves building a deck of adventurers and equipment to defeat monsters. Each turn players must decide whether to visit the Village (to purchase cards, upgrade heroes and other actions), or if they will face a monster in the current dungeon (using the heroes and equipment in their hand). Defeated monsters are added to a player's deck as well, where they may contribute money and/or other bonuses when in hand.

Thunderstone Advance
Many game elements including the card layout have undergone a major redesign in 2012. This has caused the game series to continue under the new name Thunderstone Advance. Cards from the original series and the Advance series are compatible as they share the same back cover artwork. In the Thunderstone Advance series, each set comes with a handful of Thunderstone Bearers that act as monster bosses in the game.

Thunderstone Quest (2017)
Thunderstone Quest brings new play modes to the table. The game will tell a specific story with a series of pre-set dungeon tiles, monsters, heroes and support cards. Each will come with a series of mini-adventures and a story booklet that tells players what happens as they progress through the scenarios.

Once players have completed the quests they will be able to enjoy great replay value with the available selection of monsters, heroes, and support cards, as well as the new dungeon tiles, by choosing random set-ups before the start of play. Aside from heroes such as wizards, fighters, rogues, and clerics, cards will include supplies that heroes need like weapons, spells, items, or light to reach further into the dungeon.

The dungeon deck is created by combining several different groups of monsters together. Certain groups of monsters may be more or less susceptible to different hero types, so players have to take this into account when they choose what to buy.

Releases 
The games denoted as B contain Base cards (Militia/Regulars, Daggers/Longspears, Torches, etc) and experience cards (tokens in Advance) and can therefore be played standalone.

Original series

Thunderstone Advance series

The Worlds Collide and Into the Abyss sets are selection of cards from the original series (Thunderstone and its 5 expansions), redesigned to match with the Advance series. Also many cards have been tweaked for more balance.

Reception 
BoardGameGeek rates Thunderstone a 7.0 out of 10, garnering it a thematic rank of 177 out of over 500 "thematic" board games.

Awards 

 2012 Juego del Año Tico Nominee
 2011 Fairplay À la carte Winner
 2010 JoTa Best Card Game Nominee
 2010 JoTa Best Card Game Critic Award
 2010 JoTa Best Card Game Audience Award
 2010 Japan Boardgame Prize Voters' Selection Nominee
 2010 Golden Geek Best Card Game Nominee

References

External links 
Official Alderac site
 
Online implementation on yucata.de

Card games introduced in 2009
Deck-building card games
Mike Elliott (game designer) games